The co-princes of Andorra are jointly the heads of state of the Principality of Andorra, a landlocked microstate lying in the Pyrenees between France and Spain. Founded in 1278 by means of a treaty between the Bishop of Urgell and the Count of Foix, this unique diarchical arrangement has persisted through medieval times to the 21st century. Currently, the Bishop of Urgell (Joan Enric Vives Sicília) and the president of France (Emmanuel Macron) serve as Andorra's co-princes, following the transfer of the count of Foix's claims to the Crown of France and, thence, to the president of France. Each co-prince appoints a personal representative, the episcopal co-prince by Josep Maria Mauri and the French co-prince currently being represented by Patrick Strzoda.

Origin and development of the co-principality

Tradition holds that Charlemagne granted a charter to the Andorran people in return for their fighting against the Moors. The feudal overlord of this territory was at first the Count of Urgell. In 988, however, the count, Borrell II, gave Andorra to the Diocese of Urgell in exchange for land in Cerdanya. The Bishop of Urgell, based in Seu d'Urgell, has ruled Andorra ever since.

Before 1095, Andorra did not have any type of military protection, and since the Bishop of Urgell knew that the Count of Urgell wanted to reclaim the Andorran valleys, he asked for help from the lord of Caboet. In 1095, the lord and the bishop signed a declaration of their co-sovereignty over Andorra. Arnalda, daughter of Arnau of Caboet, married the viscount of Castellbò, and both became viscounts of Castellbò and Cerdanya. Their daughter, Ermessenda, married Roger Bernat II, the French count of Foix. They became, respectively, count and countess of Foix, viscount and viscountess of Castellbò and Cerdanya, and also co-sovereigns of Andorra (together with the Bishop of Urgell).

In the 11th century, a dispute arose between the Bishop of Urgell and the Count of Foix. The conflict was mediated by Aragon in 1278, and led to the signing of the first paréage, which provided that Andorra's sovereignty be shared between the count and the bishop. This gave the principality its territory and political form, and marked the formal commencement of Andorra's unique monarchical arrangement.

Through inheritance, the Foix title to Andorra passed to the kings of Navarre. After King Henry III of Navarre became King Henry IV of France, he issued an edict in 1607 establishing the king of France and the Bishop of Urgell as co-princes of Andorra. In 1812–13, the First French Empire annexed Catalonia and divided it into four départements, with Andorra forming part of the district of Puigcerdà (department of Sègre). Following the defeat of Napoleon I, a royal decree reversed this annexation, and Andorra reverted to its former independence and political state. The French head of state—whether king, emperor, or president—has continued to serve as a co-prince of Andorra ever since.

Recent history

On 12 July 1934, Andorra's monarchical system was challenged by an adventurer named Boris Skossyreff, who issued a proclamation in Urgell declaring himself "Boris I, King of Andorra".  Though initially enjoying some support within Andorra's political establishment, he was ultimately arrested by Spanish authorities on 20 July 1934 after declaring war on the Bishop of Urgell (who had refused to relinquish his own claim to the principality).  Skossyreff was expelled, and was never considered to have been the Andorran monarch in any legal sense.

Before 1993, Andorra had no codified constitution, and the exact prerogatives of the co-princes were not specifically defined in law. In March 1993, a Constitution was approved by a vote of the Andorran people and signed into law by the two reigning co-princes at the time: Bishop Joan Martí Alanis and President François Mitterrand. It clarified the continuance of the unique Andorran diarchy, and also delineated the precise role and prerogatives of the two co-princes. Prior to adoption of the Constitution, Andorra paid in odd-numbered years a tribute of approximately $460 to the French ruler, while on even-numbered years, it paid a tribute of approximately $12 to the Spanish bishop, plus six hams, six cheeses, and six live chickens. This medieval custom was subsequently abandoned in 1993.

In 2009, French president Nicolas Sarkozy threatened to abdicate as French co-prince if the principality did not change its banking laws to eliminate its longstanding status as a tax haven.

In 2014, Joan Enric Vives i Sicília said that he would abdicate as bishop of Urgell and co-prince of Andorra if the Andorran Parliament passed a law legalizing abortion. The bishopric would then be held in abeyance at least until the law had been promulgated, so that no cleric would have to sign it. This would make Andorra the second country (after Belgium) where a head of state refused to sign a law legalizing voluntary interruption of pregnancy without preventing the law's promulgation.

Contemporary political role

The Constitution of Andorra carefully defines the exact role and prerogatives of the co-princes of Andorra today. The constitution establishes Andorra as a "parliamentary coprincipality", providing for the Bishop of Urgell and the president of France to serve together as joint heads of state. The constitution distinguishes between which powers they may exercise on their own (Article 46), and which require the countersignature of the head of the Andorran government, or the approval of the "Síndic General", the Andorran legislature (Article 45).

Powers the co-princes may exercise on their own include:
Joint exercise of the "prerogative of grace" (the power to pardon);
Each co-prince may appoint one member of the Superior Council of Justice and one member of the Constitutional Tribunal;
Establishment of such services as they deem necessary to fulfil their constitutional prerogatives, and appointment of individuals to fulfil these services;
Requesting a preliminary judgement about the constitutionality of proposed laws, or of international treaties;
Agreeing to the text of any international treaty, prior to submitting it for parliamentary approval;
Bringing a case before the Constitutional Tribunal in the event of any conflict over the exercise of their constitutional prerogatives.

Powers the co-princes may exercise in conjunction with the head of government include:
Calling for elections or referendums in accordance with constitutional provisions;
Appointing the head of government in accordance with constitutional provisions;
Dissolve the General Council (the Andorran legislature) prior to the expiration of its current term (but not until at least one year has passed since the prior election);
Accrediting diplomatic representatives from Andorra to foreign states, and receive credentials of foreign representatives to Andorra;
Appointing office-holders in accordance with appropriate constitutional provisions;
Sanctioning and enacting laws in accordance with constitutional provisions;
Granting formal consent to international treaties, once ratified by the General Council.

Each co-prince is granted an annual allowance by the General Council to dispose of as he or she sees fit.  Each appoints a personal representative in Andorra, and in the case of incapacitation of one of them, the constitution provides for the other prince to govern in his or her absence, with the concurrence of the Andorran head of government or the General Council.

Certain treaties require the participation of the co-princes (or their designated representatives) in their negotiation process as well as their final approval; these are detailed in Articles 66 and 67 of the constitution.

The co-princes jointly retain the right to propose amendments to the constitution; this same right rests with the General Council.  They have no veto power over legislation passed by the General Council, though they do retain a veto over certain international treaties, as described above.

Vacancy 
In case of vacancy of either co-prince, Andorra “recognizes the validity of the interim procedures foreseen by their respective statuses, in order for the normal function of Andorran institutions not to be interrupted“.

List of rulers

See also

List of heads of government of Andorra

Notes

References

Bibliography

External links
Representació de S.E. El Copríncep Francés
El Copríncep d'Urgell
Rulers.org – Andorra list of rulers for Andorra

Co-Princes
 
 
Andorra
Andorra–France relations
Religion and politics
war:Mga Igkasi-Prinsipe han Andorra